John Cyril Mole "Johnny" Murray (21 January 1924 – 18 November 2017) was a British professional ice hockey player, coach and administrator. He was born in Hampstead, London, England. He played for the Wembley Lions between 1939 and 1967 and also played on the national team on numerous occasions including the 1948 Winter Olympics in St Moritz. Latterly he was the national team captain and coach. After his retirement from playing, Murray became a member of the British Ice Hockey Association and served on the British Olympic Committee. He was inducted into the British Ice Hockey Hall of Fame in 1996.

References

External links
British Ice Hockey Hall of Fame entry

1924 births
2017 deaths
British Ice Hockey Hall of Fame inductees
English ice hockey players
Ice hockey players at the 1948 Winter Olympics
Olympic ice hockey players of Great Britain
People from the London Borough of Camden
Sportspeople from London
Wembley Lions players